Razan Moh'd Samir Moh'd Yaser Al-Zagha (born 23 March 1999) is a Jordanian footballer who plays as a forward for the Jordan women's national team.

References 

1995 births
Living people
Jordanian women's footballers
Jordan women's international footballers
Women's association football forwards
Sportspeople from Amman
Footballers at the 2014 Asian Games
Asian Games competitors for Jordan